Postgenderism is a social, political and cultural movement which arose from the eroding of the cultural, psychological, and social role of gender, and an argument for why the erosion of binary gender will be liberatory. 

Postgenderists argue that gender is an arbitrary and unnecessary limitation on human potential, and foresee the elimination of involuntary psychological gendering in the human species as a result of social and cultural designations and through the application of neurotechnology, biotechnology, and assistive reproductive technologies.

Advocates of postgenderism argue that the presence of gender roles, social stratification, and gender differences are generally to the detriment of individuals and society. Given the radical potential for advanced assistive reproductive options, postgenderists believe that sex for reproductive purposes will either become obsolete or that all post-gendered humans will have the ability, if they so choose, to both carry a pregnancy to term and impregnate someone, which, postgenderists believe, would have the effect of eliminating the need for definite genders in such a society.

Cultural roots
Postgenderism as a cultural phenomenon has roots in feminism, masculism, along with the androgyny, metrosexual/technosexual and transgender movements. However, it has been through the application of transhumanist philosophy that postgenderists have conceived the potential for actual morphological changes to the members of the human species and how future humans in a postgender society will reproduce. In this sense, it is an offshoot of transhumanism, posthumanism, and futurism.

In the 19th century, Russian philosopher Nikolay Chernyshevsky believed that "people will be happy when there will be neither women nor men".

Urania, a feminist journal privately published between 1916 and 1940, advanced the abolishment of gender; each issue was headed with the statement: "There are no 'men' or 'women' in Urania."

One of the earliest expressions of postgenderism was Shulamith Firestone's 1970 book The Dialectic of Sex. It argues, [The] end goal of feminist revolution must be, unlike that of the first feminist movement, not just the elimination of male privilege but of the sex distinction itself: genital differences between human beings would no longer matter culturally. (A reversion to an unobstructed pansexuality Freud's 'polymorphous perversity'—would probably supersede hetero/homo/bi-sexuality.) The reproduction of the species by one sex for the benefit of both would be replaced by (at least the option of) artificial reproduction: children would be born to both sexes equally, or independently of either, however one chooses to look at it; the dependence of the child on the mother (and vice versa) would give way to a greatly shortened dependence on a small group of others in general, and any remaining inferiority to adults in physical strength would be compensated for culturally.

Another important and influential work in this regard was socialist feminist Donna Haraway's essay, "A Cyborg Manifesto: Science, Technology, and Socialist-Feminism in the Late Twentieth Century", in Simians, Cyborgs and Women: The Reinvention of Nature (New York; Routledge, 1991), pp. 149–181. In this work, Haraway is interpreted as arguing that women would only be freed from their biological restraints when their reproductive obligations were dispensed with. This may be viewed as Haraway expressing a belief that women will only achieve true liberation once they become postbiological organisms, or postgendered.  However, Haraway has publicly stated that their use of the word "post-gender" has been grossly misinterpreted.

The term "postgenderism" is also used by George Dvorsky to describe the diverse social, political, and cultural movement that affirms the voluntary elimination of gender in the human species by applying advanced biotechnology and assisted reproductive technologies. In 2008, Dvorsky wrote with James Hughes that "dyadic gender roles and sexual dimorphism are generally to the detriment of individuals and society" and that "greater biological fluidity and psychological androgyny will allow future persons to explore both masculine and feminine aspects of personality."

Types
Postgenderists are not exclusively advocates of androgyny, although most believe that a "mixing" of both feminine and masculine traits is desirable—essentially the creation of androgynous individuals who exhibit the best of what females and males have to offer in terms of physical and psychological abilities and proclivities. Just what these traits are exactly is a matter of great debate and conjecture.

Postgenderism is not concerned solely with the physical sex or its assumed traits. It is focused on the idea of eliminating or moving beyond gendered identities. In a traditional gender construct, one is either a man or woman, but in postgenderism one is neither a man nor woman nor any other assumed gender role. Thus an individual in society is not reduced to a gender role but is simply an agent of humanity who is to be defined (if at all) by one's actions.

However, not all postgenderists are against the existence of gender roles in some form; some only argue for the deemphasization of gender roles. In this situation, people would be able to identify as a gender if they decided to, but identifying as one would not be mandatory, and gender roles would have little bearing on how people actually act or are treated in society.

Future technologies

In regard to potential assistive reproductive technologies, it is believed that reproduction can continue to happen outside of conventional methods, namely intercourse and artificial insemination. Advances such as human cloning, parthenogenesis and artificial wombs may significantly extend the potential for human reproduction.Bodies and personalities in our postgender future will no longer be constrained and circumscribed by gendered traits, but enriched by their use in the palette of diverse self-expression.

Many argue that posthuman space will be more virtual than real. Individuals may consist of uploaded minds living as data patterns on supercomputers or users engaged in completely immersive virtual realities. Postgenderists contend that these types of existences are not gender-specific thus allowing individuals to morph their virtual appearances and sexuality at will.

Sexuality
Postgenderists maintain that a genderless society does not imply the existence of a species uninterested in sex and sexuality. It is thought that sexual relations and interpersonal intimacy can and will exist in a postgendered future, but that those activities may take on different forms. For example, this theory raises the relationship between gender and technologies such as the latter's role in the dismantling of the conventional gender order. Postgenderism, however, is not directly concerned with the physical action of sex or with sexuality. It is believed to offer a more egalitarian system where individuals are classified according to factors such as age, talents, and interests instead of gender.

Novels with postgenderist themes
2312 by Kim Stanley Robinson
Ancillary Justice by Ann Leckie
Beatrice the Sixteenth by Irene Clyde
Distress by Greg Egan
Don't Bite the Sun by Tanith Lee
Glasshouse by Charles Stross
Steel Beach by John Varley
The Left Hand of Darkness by Ursula K. Le Guin
Venus Plus X by Theodore Sturgeon
Woman on the Edge of Time by Marge Piercy

See also

Anti-gender movement
Cyberfeminism
Cyborg feminism
Feminist science fiction
Gender-critical feminism
Gender ambiguity
Gender anti-essentialism
Genderless language
Gender neutrality
Intersex
LGBT linguistics
LGBT themes in speculative fiction
Morphological freedom
Non-binary gender
Postsexualism
Poststructural feminism
Role theory
Queer theory
Sex differences in humans
Social construction of gender

References

Sources

Galántai, Zoltán. Proposal for the Declaration of Intelligent Beings' Rights. Technical University of Budapest
Haraway, Donna. "A Cyborg Manifesto: Science, Technology, and Socialist-Feminism in the Late Twentieth Century," in Simians, Cyborgs and Women: The Reinvention of Nature (New York; Routledge, 1991), pp. 149–181.
Schaub, Joseph Christopher. Presenting the Cyborg's Futurist Past: An Analysis of Dziga Vertov's Kino-Eye. Department of Comparative Literature, University of Maryland

External links

Gender identity
Bioethics
Futures studies
Social philosophy
Radical feminism
Non-binary gender
Transhumanism